Sandra Domene Pérez (born 4 April 2000 Terrassa) is a Spanish water polo goalkeeper.

She competed for the Spain women's national water polo team in the 2015 European Games, and 2017 World Aquatics Championships.

References

External links 
 
 Sandra Domene viatja al Mundial de Gwangju amb la selecció espanyola de Waterpolo Beach
 World Women's youth Water polo championships
 L’egarenca Sandra Domene, plata a Gwangju amb la selecció espanyola de Waterpolo Beach

Spanish female water polo players
2000 births
Living people
World Aquatics Championships medalists in water polo
Water polo players at the 2015 European Games
European Games medalists in water polo
European Games silver medalists for Spain
21st-century Spanish women